Bij ons in de Jordaan  is a 2000 Dutch television series directed by Willem van de Sande Bakhuyzen, a biography of the singer Johnny Jordaan.

The series was based on the biography Bij ons schijnt de zon by Bert Hiddema, and consisted of three 50-minute episodes. It won two Golden Calf awards, for best actor and best director in a drama show.

It was released on DVD in 2009.

Cast
Kees Prins - Johnny Jordaan
Pierre Bokma - Willy Alberti
Jeroen Willems - Wim Sonneveld
Jacob Derwig - Young Arie
John Leddy - Old Arie
Marieke Heebink - Totty
Ricky Koole - Karin
Kees Hulst - Karin's father
Marlies Heuer - Karin's mother
Cecile Heuer - Johnny Jordaan's mother
Helmert Woudenberg - Ome Nijs

References

External links 
 

Dutch drama television series
2000 Dutch television series debuts
Dutch-language television shows
2000 Dutch television series endings
2000s Dutch television series